Nadirah A. McKenith (born September 6, 1991) is an American professional basketball player. She was drafted in 2013, by the Washington Mystics of the WNBA.

Career

Born in Newark, New Jersey, McKenith played college basketball at St. John's, where she was an all-Big East point guard. Drafted with the 5th pick of the second round of the 2013 WNBA Draft, McKenith made the Washington Mystics out of training camp, and played in 32 games for the Mystics during her rookie season.

She was signed by the Minnesota Lynx on June 24, 2014

WNBA career statistics

Regular season

|-
| align="left" | 2013
| align="left" | Washington
| 32 || 0 || 8.8 || .372 || .318 || .735 || 1.1 || 1.0 || 0.6 || 0.1 || 0.7 || 2.8
|-
| align="left" | 2014
| align="left" | Minnesota
| 6 || 0 || 4.0 || .250 || .000 || 1.000 || 0.7 || 0.2 || 0.2 || 0.0 || 0.2 || 0.7
|-
| align="left" | Career
| align="left" | 2 years, 2 teams
| 38 || 0 || 8.1 || .366 || .318 || .750 || 1.1 || 0.9 || 0.5 || 0.1 || 0.6 || 2.5

Playoffs

|-
| align="left" | 2013
| align="left" | Washington
| 3|| 0 || 8.7 || .000 || .000 || 1.000 || 1.3 || 1.3 || 0.7 || 0.0 || 1.7 || 0.7
|-
| align="left" | 2014
| align="left" | Minnesota
| 2 || 0 || 1.0 || .000 || .000 || 1.000 || 0.0 || 0.5 || 0.0 || 0.0 || 0.0 || 1.0
|-
| align="left" | Career
| align="left" | 2 years, 2 teams
| 5 || 0 || 5.6 || .000 || .000 || 1.000 || 0.8 || 1.0 || 0.4 || 0.0 || 1.0 || 0.8

St.  John's statistics
Source

References

External links
St. John's Red Storm bio

1991 births
Living people
American women's basketball players
Basketball players from Newark, New Jersey
Guards (basketball)
Minnesota Lynx players
St. John's Red Storm women's basketball players
Washington Mystics draft picks
Washington Mystics players